The 2021 term of the Supreme Court of the United States began October 4, 2021, and concluded October 2, 2022. The table below illustrates which opinion was filed by each justice in each case and which justices joined each opinion.

Table key

2021 term opinions

2021 term membership and statistics
This was the seventeenth term of Chief Justice Roberts's tenure. Justice Breyer retired on June 30, 2022, making it the second and final (and also the only full) term with the same membership. The seat was filled by Ketanji Brown Jackson on the same day.

Notes

References

 
 

Lists of United States Supreme Court opinions by term